Mühlner Motorsport is a Belgian auto racing team competing in the FIA GT1 World Championship. It will enter two Porsche 997 GT3-Rs in the 2012 season under the name Exim Bank Team China, and it will compete under a Chinese racing licence. The team's drivers for the 2012 season are Ren Wei and Benjamin Lariche in car #8, and Mike Parisy and Matt Halliday in car #9.

References

External links
 Mühlner Motorsport

Belgian auto racing teams
FIA GT1 World Championship teams
Porsche Supercup teams
ADAC GT Masters teams
WeatherTech SportsCar Championship teams
European Le Mans Series teams
Blancpain Endurance Series teams